Bradley Yaeger (born January 7, 1985 in Ottawa) is a Canadian former competitive ice dancer. He represented Greece internationally with partner Christa-Elizabeth Goulakos.

Career
In August 2002, he teamed up with Mylène Girard. They are the 2003 Canadian junior silver medalists. They were two-time competitors at the Four Continents Championships, with the highest placement of 5th in 2006. They were two-season competitors on the Grand Prix of Figure Skating. They announced the end of their partnership following their withdrawal from the 2006 Cup of Russia.

References

External links 
 
 
 Girard / Yaeger tracings.net profile

Canadian male ice dancers
Greek male ice dancers
1985 births
Living people
Sportspeople from Ottawa